Earl Bell Gilmore (1887–1964) was the son of Arthur Fremont Gilmore and took control of the family businesses, including the Gilmore Oil Company, in 1918. He was inducted into the Indianapolis Motor Speedway Museum in 1987.

References

1887 births
1964 deaths
American businesspeople in the oil industry
Burials at Evergreen Cemetery, Los Angeles